Sylvie Lespérance (December 21, 1954 – September 22, 2006) was a politician in Quebec, Canada, who served as the Action démocratique du Québec Member of the National Assembly for the electoral district of Joliette from 2002 to 2003.

Lespérance, who was born in Jonquière, had been a lifelong Liberal supporter months before she first was elected to the National Assembly.

She ran unsuccessfully against Parti Québécois (PQ) cabinet member Guy Chevrette in the 1989 and 1998 elections.

She was elected to the National Assembly in a by-election held on June 17, 2002 with 38% of the vote.  PQ star candidate and Bloc Québécois (BQ) Member of Parliament Michel Bellehumeur finished second with 32% of the vote.

In 2003 election, Lespérance finished third with 21% of the vote, behind PQ candidate Jonathan Valois (39%).

Lespérance died in Saint-Alphonse-de-Rodriguez in 2006.

Footnotes

External links
 

Action démocratique du Québec MNAs
1954 births
2006 deaths
Politicians from Saguenay, Quebec
Université de Montréal alumni
Women MNAs in Quebec
21st-century Canadian politicians
21st-century Canadian women politicians
20th-century Canadian women politicians